Tyrone is a town in Fayette County, Georgia, United States. The population was 6,879 at the 2010 census, up from 3,916 in 2000. The estimated population in 2018 was 7,388. It is a part of the Atlanta metropolitan area.

History
The Georgia General Assembly incorporated Tyrone as a town in 1911. The community's name is a transfer from County Tyrone, in Northern Ireland.

Economy

Many developers have flocked to Tyrone due to its high land value and accessibility to Atlanta. A number of new projects are set to debut in Tyrone in the near future. They include a restoration of the old downtown, new residential communities, a golf cart path system that will connect to Peachtree City and a new public library.

Geography

Tyrone is located in the northwest corner of Fayette County at  (33.473563, -84.591229). It is bordered to the south by Peachtree City, to the west by Coweta County, across Line Creek, and the north by Fulton County.

Georgia State Route 74, the Joel Cowan Parkway, passes through Tyrone, leading north  to Interstate 85 on the south side of Fairburn.

Demographics

2020 census

As of the 2020 United States census, there were 7,658 people, 2,506 households, and 2,178 families residing in the town.

2000 census
As of the census of 2000, there were 3,916 people, 1,374 households, and 1,158 families residing in the town. The racial makeup of the town was 56.93% White, 38.13% African American, .37% Native American, 2.56% Asian, 1% from other races, and 1.01% from two or more races. Hispanic or Latino people of any race were 9.5% of the population.

There were 1,374 households, out of which 41.6% had children under the age of 18 living with them, 73.3% were married couples living together, 7.9% had a female householder with no husband present, and 15.7% were non-families. 12.9% of all households were made up of individuals, and 4.5% had someone living alone who was 65 years of age or older. The average household size was 2.85 and the average family size was 3.12.

In the town, the population was spread out, with 27.4% under the age of 18, 6.7% from 18 to 24, 27.7% from 25 to 44, 30.1% from 45 to 64, and 8.1% who were 65 years of age or older. The median age was 39 years. For every 100 females, there were 94.3 males. For every 100 females age 18 and over, there were 93.5 males.

The median income for a household in the town was $63,080, and the median income for a family was $71,406. Males had a median income of $45,788 versus $29,231 for females. The per capita income for the town was $26,463. None of the families and 0.9% of the population were living below the poverty line, including no under eighteens and none of those over 64.

Education
Within the town of Tyrone there are three public schools: Burch Elementary, Flat Rock Middle, and Sandy Creek High School. These three are located in a triangle configuration on the same street (Jenkins Road). Our Lady of Victory Catholic School is located on Kirkley (aka "Kirkly") Road off Highway 74. South of town is Crabapple Elementary School. East of town is Bennett's Mill Middle School.

Notable people
Joey Clanton, NASCAR driver
Calvin Johnson, NFL football player, Detroit Lions
Andrew Gardner, NFL football player, Miami Dolphins 
Kedric Golston, NFL football player, Washington Redskins
Morris Robinson, operatic bass, Metropolitan Opera
Brittany Swann, Miss Georgia USA 2007

References

External links
 Town of Tyrone official website
 Palmer Family Cemetery historical marker

Towns in Fayette County, Georgia
Towns in Georgia (U.S. state)